Gianfranco Sibello (born 4 October 1975) is an Italian sailor. He competed at the 2012 Summer Olympics in the 49er class.

References

External Links
  (new website)
 

1975 births
Living people
Olympic sailors of Italy
Italian male sailors (sport)
Sailors at the 2004 Summer Olympics – 49er
Sailors at the 2008 Summer Olympics – 49er
Sailors at the 2012 Summer Olympics – 49er